The Women's 4x200 Freestyle Relay event at the 11th FINA World Aquatics Championships swam on 28 July 2005 in Montreal, Canada

At the start of the event, the existing World (WR) and Championships (CR) records were:
WR: 7:53.42 swum by USA on 18 August 2004 in Athens, Greece
CR: 7:55.70 swum by USA on 24 July 2003 in Barcelona, Spain

Results

Final

Preliminaries

References

Swimming at the 2005 World Aquatics Championships
2005 in women's swimming